Shunkichi (written: 俊吉 or 駿吉) is a masculine Japanese given name. Notable people with the name include:

, Japanese field hockey player
, Japanese photographer

Japanese masculine given names